Mark Cousins may refer to:

 Mark Cousins (filmmaker) (born 1965), Northern Irish writer, director and producer
 Mark Cousins (footballer) (born 1987), English goalkeeper
 Mark Cousins (writer) (1947–2020), British intellectual